Nicolas Mahut and Édouard Roger-Vasselin were the defending champions, but lost in the final to Robert Lindstedt and Jan-Lennard Struff, 6–2, 6–7(1–7), [4–10].

Seeds

Draw

Draw

References

External links
 Main Draw

Moselle Open - Doubles
2019 Moselle Open